Ferdinand II of Aragon's marriage to Isabella I of Castile produced seven children, five of whom survived birth and lived to adulthood.  They arranged strategic political marriages for all of these children to powerful monarchs and well-connected women. Although several bloodlines were cut short and the rest initially intermarried to form a close-knit group centered around the House of Habsburg, this group became the most powerful family in Europe. Within only six generations of the Catholic Monarchs their offspring ruled in the Holy Roman Empire, the Kingdom of France, the Kingdom of Spain, the Kingdom of England, the Kingdom of Portugal (before, during and after the Iberian Union), the Archduchy of Austria with the Kingdom of Bohemia and the Kingdom of Hungary in personal union, the Kingdom of Poland with the Grand Duchy of Lithuania in personal union, Electorate of Brandenburg with the Duchy of Prussia in personal union, the Electorate of Saxony, the Duchy of Mantua, the Duchy of Montferrat, the Duchy of Parma, the Duchy of Lorraine and others.

Among the living descendants of Isabella I and Ferdinand II are all of the current European monarchs from hereditary monarchies (i.e. not Andorra and Vatican City). Felipe VI of Spain, Henri of Luxembourg are both descended in the male line from Philip V of Spain, whose grandmother Maria Theresa of Spain was a male-line descendant of Ferdinand and Isabella's daughter Joanna the Mad. Many other paths are possible to find due to interbreeding. Philippe of Belgium is also a descent multiple time over. One such path goes through Leopold III of Belgium, Miguel I of Portugal and Charles IV of Spain back to Philip V again. Although the Protestant Reformation divided Europe in half in terms of royal intermarriage, through the children of Maria of Austria, Duchess Consort of Jülich-Cleves-Berg the bloodline also entered the Protestant noble houses and can therefore be traced to Britain, the Scandinavia and the Netherlands. The most commons line pass through Maria's great-great-granddaughter Princess Elisabeth Sophie of Saxe-Altenburg.

Some British lines descend from Henrietta Maria of France, granddaughter of Joanna of Austria, Grand Duchess of Tuscany. Although her legitimate descendants in Britain were banished during the Glorious Revolution, many remain descending from the bastard children of Charles II and James VII. Princess Diana was and her sons and grandchildren are among this group by virtue of descent from Henry FitzRoy, 1st Duke of Grafton and Henrietta FitzJames.

Charles III of the United Kingdom as well as every monarch of Britain since George III are descendants. George III's mother was Princess Augusta of Saxe-Gotha, a great-granddaughter of Elisabeth Sophie. Margrethe II of Denmark and Carl XVI Gustaf of Sweden share as their grandmother Princess Margaret of Connaught, a granddaughter of Queen Victoria, herself granddaughter to George III. Harald V of Norway's grandmother was Maud of Wales, another granddaughter of Victoria. A different line from Maria of Austria passes through Duchess Sophie of Prussia and her great-great-grandson William IV, Prince of Orange, whose grandson was elevated in rank to become William I of the Netherlands. Willem-Alexander of the Netherlands is his descendant, although not in the male line, but through a series of three queens-regnant of the Netherlands.

The two princes Albert II of Monaco and Hans-Adam II of Liechtenstein also have this blood. Albert's was introduced to the Grimaldi family by Lady Mary Victoria Douglas-Hamilton, granddaughter of Charles, Grand Duke of Baden. Charles was, among other ways this descent can be traced, a double great-grandson of Louis VIII, Landgrave of Hesse-Darmstadt, a great-grandson of Elisabeth Sophie. Hans-Adam has the bloodline from his grandmother Archduchess Elisabeth Amalie of Austria, who was both a Habsburg with near male-line descent (excluding Maria Theresa and Joanna the Mad) and a granddaughter of Miguel I of Portugal mentioned above as an ancestor of Philippe of Belgium.

References 

Descendants of individuals
House of Trastámara
15th-century Spanish people
16th-century Spanish people
House of Aviz

Spanish royalty
Dukes of Savoy
Ferdinand II of Aragon
Isabella I of Castile